Robert Y. Thornton (January 28, 1910 – November 29, 2003) was an American attorney, politician, and jurist in the U.S. state of Oregon. A Democrat, he was the second-longest serving Oregon Attorney General in the state's history, holding that office from 1953 to 1969.  His 16-year tenure was second only to Republican Isaac Homer Van Winkle, who bested him by seven years, serving from 1920 to 1943. Thornton was the Democratic nominee for Oregon Governor in 1962, losing in the general election to incumbent Mark Hatfield.

His ultimate defeat by Republican Lee Johnson, who garnered some 80,000 more votes than Thornton in the 1968 general election, became a matter for the courts. Thornton challenged the outcome by bringing a suit charging that Johnson had violated campaign spending limits and falsified a report by signing the blank form. Johnson admitted he had done so in anticipation of being out of the country when the report was to be filed. A three-judge panel in Marion County ruled in favor of Thornton, invalidating the election results and awarding Thornton an additional term.  The Oregon Supreme Court overturned that decision and awarded the office to Johnson, on the grounds that neither violation was deliberate and that both had occurred after the election.

Education

AB, Stanford University, 1932
Postgraduate study, University of Oregon, 1933–35
JD, George Washington University, 1937

Career

 1971-1983 - Judge, Oregon Court of Appeals
 1953-1969 - Oregon Attorney General
 1951-1953 - Oregon State Representative
 1946-1953 - Private practice of law (Tillamook, Oregon)
 1941-1946 - U.S. Army, World War II, Japan, attaining rank of Lieutenant Colonel
 1939-1941 - Private practice of law (Tillamook)
 1938-1939 - Assistant Solicitor, U.S. Department of the Interior
 1937-1938 - Law Clerk, District of Columbia Court of Appeals

Publications

References

1910 births
2003 deaths
Oregon Attorneys General
George Washington University Law School alumni
Members of the Oregon House of Representatives
Stanford University alumni
People from Tillamook, Oregon
Oregon Court of Appeals judges
20th-century American judges